Tioga is an unincorporated community in northern Rapides Parish, Louisiana, United States. It is part of the Alexandria, Louisiana Metropolitan Statistical Area. The population in 2010 was 1,965.

History

Tioga originated as a lumber mill town. Swords Lee, who represented Grant Parish in the Louisiana House of Representatives from 1904 to 1908, operated a large sawmill there until it closed c. 1917 because of exhaustion of the timber supply. At the Tioga commissary, workers could use their mill script to buy groceries and supplies. Outside workers were paid a quarter per hour; if he worked inside the mill, he earned $3 per day. Many laborers were granted mill housing across the street from the commissary in "shotgun"-style shacks. The mill whistle announced the time to report for work, lunch, and the ending of the work shift.

After the heyday of the lumber business, the United States military during World War II established local training facilities at nearby Camp Beauregard and Camp Livingston. The two military establishments played a major role in preparing United States military forces during World War II.  The "Louisiana Maneuvers" prior to World War II originated at Camp Beauregard.

Today Camp Livingston, located near Ball, has been abandoned and become largely overgrown. Its area has become part of Kisatchie National Forest. Risk remains of unexploded ordnance in the old firing ranges; visitors are advised to remain on approved roads and trails. Camp Beauregard remains an active base of the Louisiana National Guard.

Education

Tioga Elementary serves kindergarten through grade 6. Grades 7–8 are taught at Tioga Junior High School while Tioga High School serves grades 9-12.

Recreation
Tioga is also served by the Ward Ten Recreation District, which participates in Dixie Youth baseball and Dixie Girls softball. The Dixie Belles (ages 13–15) won the 2001 Dixie Belles World Series.

Geography
Tioga is located at (31.38694, Lon: -92.42556).

Climate
This climatic region is typified by relatively small seasonal temperature differences, with warm to hot (and often humid) summers and mild winters. According to the Köppen Climate Classification system, Tioga has a humid subtropical climate, abbreviated "Cfa" on climate maps.

References

Unincorporated communities in Rapides Parish, Louisiana
Alexandria metropolitan area, Louisiana
Unincorporated communities in Louisiana